Ryszard Roman Kalisz (born 26 February 1957 in Warsaw) is a Polish lawyer, left-wing politician, former member of the Democratic Left Alliance party. In early years he joined the Socialist Union of Polish Students, where he was deputy director of the Main Auditing Committee. He was a member of the Polish United Workers' Party from 1978 until its dissolution in 1990.

He was the Minister of Internal Affairs and Administration in the cabinet of Marek Belka. Kalisz was elected to the Sejm on 25 September 2005, getting 36,013 votes in the 19th Warsaw district, campaigning from the Democratic Left Alliance list.

He is also a member of the Sejm 2001-2005.

He divorced in 2009. With his new wife Dominika, they have two children: Antoniusz (his step son) and Fryderyk (b. 2015).

See also
Members of Polish Sejm 2005-2007

References

External links
 Official page
 Ryszard Kalisz - parliamentary page - includes declarations of interest, voting record, and transcripts of speeches.

1957 births
Living people
Politicians from Warsaw
Polish United Workers' Party members
Members of the Polish Sejm 2005–2007
Members of the Polish Sejm 2001–2005
Democratic Left Alliance politicians
Democratic Left Alliance MEPs
MEPs for Poland 2004
Recipients of the Silver Medal for Merit to Culture – Gloria Artis
Recipients of the Gold Cross of Merit (Poland)
Interior ministers of Poland
Lawyers from Warsaw
Members of the Polish Sejm 2007–2011
Members of the Polish Sejm 2011–2015